"Each Small Candle" is a song by Roger Waters. The song was premiered as part of In the Flesh tour and subsequently released on the live album In the Flesh – Live in 2000. No studio version of the song has been released.

During the In the Flesh tour "Each Small Candle" was included in the encore of all the concerts of the 2000, and some of the concerts of the 2002 tour (alternating with "Flickering Flame", another new song).

Most of the lyrics were inspired by a news story from the Kosovo war of a Serbian soldier who saw a wounded Albanian woman, left his ranks and helped her.

References

 Each Small Candle on RogerWaters.com - included reference to the "South American man who had been tortured".
 Who is Who - claim about the real story behind Each Small Candle

2000 songs
Roger Waters songs
Songs written by Roger Waters
Song recordings produced by Roger Waters
Rock ballads